A list of films produced by the Israeli film industry in 1998.

1998 releases

Unknown premiere date

Awards

See also
1998 in Israel

References

External links
 Israeli films of 1998 at the Internet Movie Database

Israeli
Film
1998